Smestow Academy (formerly Smestow School), also known as simply Smestow (pronounced "smest-oh") is a coeducational secondary school and sixth form located in the Castlecroft area of Wolverhampton, England.

History
The school was founded in 1964 under the authority of Staffordshire County Council. Originally it was known as Tettenhall Number 2 with the number 1 school becoming Regis (now The King's School). It is named after the River Smestow, to which it is very close, although the school grounds are actually bordered by the Finchfield Brook and the Staffordshire and Worcestershire Canal. It was incorporated within Wolverhampton by the boundary changes accompanying local government reform in 1974, which brought Castlecroft and Tettenhall into Wolverhampton.

The school became a specialist Sports college, and was presented with ARTSMARK (alongside the previously awarded SPORTSMARK) in 2004 for outstanding success in Drama & the Arts. Smestow has a wide variety of sporting facilities including a gymnasium, swimming pool, PE hall, four separate changing rooms, a fitness suite/gym, a small dance/aerobics area (also used for drama room) a set of tennis courts and two large playing fields as well as the new sports hall.

In February 2014 the school converted to academy status, and became part of the University of Wolverhampton Multi-Academy Trust. In January 2023 Smestow School was rebrokered, and was renamed Smestow Academy.

In January 2015 a new Sixth Form Study Centre and library opened to promote and support students studying at Smestow.

School Badge
The school badge has its origins in the Tettenhall coat of arms. The three roundels in the arms are of a special type, with a distinctive wavy pattern, known in Heraldry as fountains. They were considered to represent the Severn/Trent watershed and the tributary rivers which originate in the area, which include the River Smestow. The original Tettenhall arms had three trees, representing the three great forests of southern Staffordshire which met at Tettenhall: the forests of Kinver, Brewood and Cannock. The school badge adapted this into a tree composed of four circles, representing the four houses of the school, which were named after the new Universities of Lancaster, Sussex, Warwick and York, founded around the same time as the school. The badge also contains allusions to other features of the Tettenhall arms: the Windmill and the Battleaxes, reminders of the Battle of Tettenhall which took place on 5 August 910.

Notable former pupils
 Suzi Perry, English television presenter, columnist and model
 Sam Winnall a professional footballer currently at Scunthorpe United FC
 Andy Tennant, European Track Champion Cyclist for Great Britain (2006)
 Satnam Rana, BBC Midlands Today television presenter
 Rob Manuel, Web Media Producer
 Lisa Potts GM, former nursery teacher
 Sam Andrew Gumbley, better known by his stage name S-X, is a British record producer, singer and songwriter

References

External links
 Smestow Academy Official Site

Educational institutions established in 1964
Secondary schools in Wolverhampton
Academies in Wolverhampton
1964 establishments in England